Delson is an off-island suburb (South shore) of Montreal, Quebec, Canada. It is situated 8 mi/13 km SSE of Montreal within the regional county municipality of Roussillon in the administrative region of Montérégie. The population as of the Canada 2021 Census was 8,328.

On its small territory, Delson is crossed by Route 132 and the Turtle River (Rivière de la Tortue). The city owns a portion of the Champlain industrial park as well as the Delson commuter train station with service to and from Montreal on the AMT's Candiac Line.

History 
The origin of the name Delson comes from the Delaware and Hudson Railway, now a subsidiary of the Canadian Pacific Railway, which runs through the town.  The Canadian Railway Museum (Exporail) occupies a large tract between Delson and Saint-Constant.

Delson was founded in 1918 as a village municipality before obtaining its status of a city 21 February 1957. The village of Delson was created from three parishes: St Andrews (1924) of the United Church and St David (1938) of the Anglican as well as Sainte-Thérèse-de-l'Enfant-Jésus (1932) of the Catholic faith.

Geography 
The city lies along the south shore of the Saint Lawrence River, south of the island of Montreal.

Lakes & Rivers 
The following waterways pass through or are situated within the municipality's boundaries:
Rivière de la Tortue – runs south to north through the center of Delson, emptying into the Saint Lawrence River.

Demographics 

Notable residents 
Delson is the hometown of retired NHL goalie Marcel Cousineau.

See also 
Roussillon Regional County Municipality
Rivière de la Tortue (Delson)
List of cities in Quebec

References

External links 

Official Site Ville de Delson (French only)
Official Site AMT
Official Site Canadian Railway Museum (Exporail) at Delson/Saint-Constant

Cities and towns in Quebec
Incorporated places in Roussillon Regional County Municipality
Quebec populated places on the Saint Lawrence River
Greater Montreal
Delaware and Hudson Railway